Hirofumi Yanagase is a Japanese politician who is a member of the House of Councillors of Japan. He is a representative member of the national proportional representation block.

Biography 
In 1997, he graduated from Waseda University.

In 2004, he served as Official Secretary to Renho. In 2007, he was elected to the Ota City Assembly, and later in 2009 to the Tokyo Metropolitan Assembly. 
He was elected in 2019.

External links 
Official Policey

References 

Living people
1974 births
Waseda University alumni